The Mỹ Lai massacre was the mass murder of unarmed South Vietnamese civilians by United States troops in Sơn Tịnh district, South Vietnam, on 16 March 1968 during the Vietnam War. Between 347 and 504 unarmed people were killed by U.S. Army soldiers from Company C, 1st Battalion, 20th Infantry Regiment and Company B, 4th Battalion, 3rd Infantry Regiment, 11th Brigade, 23rd (Americal) Infantry Division. Victims included men, women, children, and infants. Some of the women were gang-raped and their bodies mutilated, and some soldiers mutilated and raped children who were as young as 12. Twenty-six soldiers were charged with criminal offenses, but only Lieutenant William Calley Jr., a platoon leader in C Company, was convicted. Found guilty of murdering 22 villagers, he was originally given a life sentence, but served three-and-a-half years under house arrest after President Richard Nixon commuted his sentence.

This war crime, which was later called "the most shocking episode of the Vietnam War", took place in two hamlets of Sơn Mỹ village in Quảng Ngãi Province. These hamlets were marked on the U.S. Army topographic maps as Mỹ Lai and Mỹ Khê.

The U.S. Army slang name for the hamlets and sub-hamlets in that area was Pinkville, and the carnage was initially referred to as the Pinkville Massacre. Later, when the U.S. Army started its investigation, the media changed it to the Massacre at Songmy. Currently, the event is referred to as the Mỹ Lai Massacre in the United States and called the Sơn Mỹ Massacre in Vietnam.

The massacre prompted global outrage when it became public knowledge in November 1969. The massacre contributed to domestic opposition to the U.S. involvement in the Vietnam War, both because of the scope of killing and cover-up attempts.

Initially, three U.S. servicemen who had tried to halt the massacre and rescue the hiding civilians were shunned, and even denounced as traitors by several U.S. Congressmen, including Mendel Rivers (D–SC), Chairman of the House Armed Services Committee. Thirty years later, these servicemen were recognized and decorated, one posthumously, by the U.S. Army for shielding non-combatants from harm in a war zone.

Mỹ Lai is the largest publicized massacre of civilians by U.S. forces in the 20th century.

Operation

Charlie Company, 1st Battalion, 20th Infantry Regiment, 11th Brigade, 23rd Infantry Division, arrived in South Vietnam in December 1967. Though their first three months in Vietnam passed without any direct contact with People's Army of Vietnam or Viet Cong (VC) forces, by mid-March the company had suffered 28 casualties involving mines or booby-traps. 

During the Tet Offensive in January 1968, attacks were carried out in Quảng Ngãi by the VC 48th Local Force Battalion. U.S. military intelligence assumed that the 48th Battalion, having retreated and dispersed, was taking refuge in the village of Sơn Mỹ, in Quảng Ngãi Province. A number of specific hamlets within that village – designated Mỹ Lai (1) through Mỹ Lai (6) – were suspected of harboring the 48th. Sơn Mỹ was located southwest of the Batangan Peninsula, a VC stronghold throughout the war.

In February and March 1968, the U.S. Military Assistance Command, Vietnam (MACV) was aggressively trying to regain the strategic initiative in South Vietnam after the Tet Offensive, and the search-and-destroy operation against the 48th Battalion thought to be located in Sơn Mỹ became a small part of the US military's overall strategy. Task Force Barker (TF Barker), a battalion-sized ad hoc unit of 11th Brigade, was to be deployed for the operation. It was formed in January 1968, composed of three rifle companies of the 11th Brigade, including Charlie Company, led by Lieutenant Colonel (LTC) Frank A. Barker. Sơn Mỹ village was included in the area of operations of TF Barker. The area of operations (AO) was codenamed Muscatine AO, after Muscatine County, Iowa, the home county of the 23rd Division's commander, Major General Samuel W. Koster.

In February 1968, TF Barker had already tried to secure Sơn Mỹ, with limited success. After that, the village area began to be referred to as Pinkville by TF Barker troops.

On 16–18 March, TF Barker planned to engage and destroy the remnants of the 48th Battalion, allegedly hiding in the Sơn Mỹ village area. Before the engagement, Colonel Oran K. Henderson, the 11th Brigade commander, urged his officers to "go in there aggressively, close with the enemy and wipe them out for good". In turn, LTC Barker reportedly ordered the 1st Battalion commanders to burn the houses, kill the livestock, destroy food supplies, and destroy and/or poison the wells.

On the eve of the attack, at the Charlie Company briefing, Captain Ernest Medina told his men that nearly all the civilian residents of the hamlets in Sơn Mỹ village would have left for the market by 07:00, and that any who remained would most likely be VC or VC sympathizers. He was asked whether the order included the killing of women and children. Those present later gave differing accounts of Medina's response. Some, including platoon leaders, testified that the orders, as they understood them, were to kill all VC and North Vietnamese combatants and "suspects" (including women and children, as well as all animals), to burn the village, and pollute the wells. He was quoted as saying, "They're all VC, now go and get them", and was heard to reply to the question "Who is my enemy?", by saying, "Anybody that was running from us, hiding from us, or appeared to be the enemy. If a man was running, shoot him, sometimes even if a woman with a rifle was running, shoot her."

At Calley's trial, one defense witness testified that he remembered Medina instructing to destroy everything in the village that was "walking, crawling or growling".

Charlie Company was to enter the village of Sơn Mỹ spearheaded by 1st Platoon, engage the enemy, and flush them out. The other two companies from TF Barker were ordered to secure the area and provide support if needed. The area was designated a free fire zone, where American forces were allowed to deploy artillery and air strikes in populated areas, without consideration of risk to civilian or non-combatant lives. Varnado Simpson, a rifleman in Charlie Company, said, "We were told to leave nothing standing. We did what we were told, regardless of whether they were civilians."

Killings

On the morning of 16 March at 07:30, around 100 soldiers from Charlie Company led by Medina, following a short artillery and helicopter gunship barrage, landed in helicopters at Sơn Mỹ, a patchwork of individual homesteads, grouped settlements, rice paddies, irrigation ditches, dikes, and dirt roads, connecting an assortment of hamlets and sub-hamlets. The largest among them were the hamlets Mỹ Lai, Cổ Lũy, Mỹ Khê, and Tu Cung.

The GIs expected to engage the Vietcong Local Force 48th Battalion, which was one of the Vietcong's most successful units. Although the GIs were not fired upon after landing, they still suspected there were VC guerrillas hiding underground or in the huts. Confirming their suspicions, the gunships engaged several armed enemies in a vicinity of Mỹ Lai, killing four; later, one weapon was retrieved from the site.

According to the operational plan, 1st Platoon, led by Second Lieutenant (2LT) William Calley, and 2nd Platoon, led by 2LT Stephen Brooks, entered the hamlet of Tu Cung in line formation at 08:00, while the 3rd Platoon, commanded by 2LT Jeffrey U. Lacross, and Captain Medina's command post remained outside. On approach, both platoons fired at people they saw in the rice fields and in the brush.

Instead of the expected enemy, the GIs found women, children and old men, many of whom were cooking breakfast over outdoor fires. The villagers were getting ready for a market day and at first did not panic or run away, as they were herded into the hamlet's common spaces and homestead yards. Harry Stanley, a machine gunner from Charlie Company, said during the U.S. Army Criminal Investigation Division inquiry that the killings started without warning. He first observed a member of 1st Platoon strike a Vietnamese man with a bayonet. Then the same trooper pushed another villager into a well and threw a grenade in the well. Next, he saw fifteen or twenty people, mainly women and children, kneeling around a temple with burning incense. They were praying and crying. They were all killed by shots to the head.

Most of the killings occurred in the southern part of Tu Cung, a sub-hamlet of Xom Lang, which was a home to 700 residents. Xom Lang was erroneously marked on the U.S. military operational maps of Quảng Ngãi Province as Mỹ Lai.

A large group of approximately 70–80 villagers was rounded up by 1st Platoon in Xom Lang and led to an irrigation ditch east of the settlement. They were then pushed into the ditch and shot dead by soldiers after repeated orders issued by Calley, who was also shooting. PFC Paul Meadlo testified that he expended several M16 rifle magazines. He recollected that women were saying "No VC" and were trying to shield their children. He remembered that he was shooting old men and women, ranging in ages from grandmothers to teenagers, many with babies or small children in their arms, since he was convinced at that time that they were all booby-trapped with grenades and were poised to attack. On another occasion during the security sweep of My Lai, Meadlo again fired into civilians side by side with Lieutenant Calley.

PFC Dennis Konti, a witness for the prosecution, told of one especially gruesome episode during the shooting, "A lot of women had thrown themselves on top of the children to protect them, and the children were alive at first. Then, the children who were old enough to walk got up and Calley began to shoot the children". Other 1st Platoon members testified that many of the deaths of individual Vietnamese men, women and children occurred inside Mỹ Lai during the security sweep. To ensure the hamlets could no longer offer support to the enemy, the livestock was shot as well.

When PFC Michael Bernhardt entered the subhamlet of Xom Lang, the massacre was underway:

One group of 20–50 villagers was herded south of Xom Lang and killed on a dirt road. According to U.S. Army photographer Sgt. Ronald Haeberle's eyewitness account of the massacre, in one instance,

Calley testified that he heard the shooting and arrived on the scene. During the massacre, a helicopter landed on the other side of the ditch and the pilot asked Calley if they could provide any medical assistance to the wounded civilians in Mỹ Lai; Calley admitted replying that "a hand grenade was the only available means he had for their evacuation". At 11:00 Medina radioed an order to cease fire, and 1st Platoon took a break, during which they ate lunch.

The platoon suffered one dead and seven wounded by mines and booby traps. After the initial sweeps by 1st and 2nd Platoons, 3rd Platoon was dispatched to deal with any "remaining resistance". 3rd Platoon, which stayed in reserve, also reportedly rounded up and killed a group of seven to twelve women and children.

It attacked the subhamlet My Hoi of the hamlet known as Cổ Lũy, which was mapped by the Army as Mỹ Khê. During this operation, between 60 and 155 people, including women and children, were killed.

Over the remaining day, both companies were involved in the further burning and destruction of dwellings, as well as continued mistreatment of Vietnamese detainees. While it was noted in the later Courts Martial proceedings that some soldiers of Charlie Company did not participate in any killings, it was also noted that they neither openly protested against them nor filed complaints later to their superiors.

William Thomas Allison, a professor of Military History at Georgia Southern University, wrote, "By midmorning, members of Charlie Company had killed hundreds of civilians and raped or assaulted countless women and young girls. They encountered no enemy fire and found no weapons in My Lai itself".

By the time the killings stopped, Charlie Company had suffered one casualtya soldier who had intentionally shot himself in the foot to avoid participating in the massacreand just three enemy weapons were confiscated.

Rapes 

According to the Peers Commission Investigation, the US government allocated commission for inquiry into the incident, concluded at least 20 Vietnamese women and girls were raped during the Mỹ Lai massacre. Since there had been little research over the case other than that of the Peers Commission, which solely accounts the cases with explicit rapes signs like torn cloth and nudity, the actual number of rapes are not easy to estimate. According to the reports, the rape victims ranged between the ages of 10 – 45, with nine being under 18. The sexual assaults included gang rapes and sexual torture.

No U.S. serviceman was charged with rape. According to an eyewitness, as reported by Seymour Hersh in his book on the massacre, a woman was raped after her children were killed by the U.S. soldiers. Another Vietnamese villager also noticed soldiers raped a 13-year-old girl.

Helicopter crew intervention

Warrant Officer Hugh Thompson Jr., a helicopter pilot from Company B (Aero-Scouts), 123rd Aviation Battalion, Americal Division, saw dead and wounded civilians as he was flying over the village of Sơn Mỹ, providing close-air support for ground forces. The crew made several attempts to radio for help for the wounded. They landed their helicopter by a ditch, which they noted was full of bodies and in which they could discern movement by survivors. Thompson asked a sergeant he encountered there (David Mitchell of 1st Platoon) if he could help get the people out of the ditch; the sergeant replied that he would "help them out of their misery". Thompson, shocked and confused, then spoke with 2LT Calley, who claimed to be "just following orders". As the helicopter took off, Thompson saw Mitchell firing into the ditch.

Thompson and his crew witnessed an unarmed woman being kicked and shot at point-blank range by Medina, who later claimed that he thought she had a hand grenade. Thompson then saw a group of civilians at a bunker being approached by ground personnel. Thompson landed, and told his crew that if the soldiers shot at the villagers while he was trying to get them out of the bunker, then they were to open fire on the soldiers.

Thompson later testified that he spoke with a lieutenant (identified as Stephen Brooks of 2nd Platoon) and told him there were women and children in the bunker, and asked if the lieutenant would help get them out. According to Thompson, "he [the lieutenant] said the only way to get them out was with a hand grenade". Thompson testified that he then told Brooks to "just hold your men right where they are, and I'll get the kids out." He found 12–16 people in the bunker, coaxed them out and led them to the helicopter, standing with them while they were flown out in two groups.

Returning to Mỹ Lai, Thompson and other air crew members noticed several large groups of bodies. Spotting some survivors in the ditch, Thompson landed again. A crew member, Specialist 4 Glenn Andreotta, entered the ditch and returned with a bloodied but apparently unharmed four-year-old girl, who was then flown to safety.

Upon returning to the LZ Dottie base in his OH-23, Thompson reported to his section leader, Captain Barry Lloyd, that the American infantry were no different from Nazis in their slaughter of innocent civilians: "It's mass murder out there. They're rounding them up and herding them in ditches and then just shooting them." Thompson then reported what he had seen to his company commander, Major Frederic W. Watke, using terms such as "murder" and "needless and unnecessary killings". Thompson's statements were confirmed by other helicopter pilots and air crew members.

For his actions at Mỹ Lai, Thompson was awarded the Distinguished Flying Cross, while his crew members Glenn Andreotta and Lawrence Colburn were awarded the Bronze Star. Glenn Andreotta was awarded his medal posthumously, as he was killed in Vietnam on April 8, 1968. As the DFC citation included a fabricated account of rescuing a young girl from Mỹ Lai from "intense crossfire", Thompson threw his medal away. He later received a Purple Heart for other services in Vietnam.

In March 1998, the helicopter crew's medals were replaced by the Soldier's Medal, the highest the U.S. Army can award for bravery not involving direct conflict with the enemy. The medal citations state they were "for heroism above and beyond the call of duty while saving the lives of at least 10 Vietnamese civilians during the unlawful massacre of non-combatants by American forces at My Lai".

Thompson initially refused to accept the medal when the U.S. Army wanted to award it quietly. He demanded it be done publicly and that his crew also be honored in the same way. The veterans also contacted the survivors of Mỹ Lai.

Aftermath

After returning to base at about 11:00, Thompson reported the massacre to his superiors. His allegations of civilian killings quickly reached LTC Barker, the operation's overall commander. Barker radioed his executive officer to find out from Medina what was happening on the ground. Medina then gave the cease-fire order to Charlie Company to "cut [the killing] out – knock it off".

Since Thompson made an official report of the civilian killings, he was interviewed by Colonel Oran Henderson, the commander of the 11th Infantry Brigade. Concerned, senior American officers canceled similar planned operations by Task Force Barker against other villages (My Lai 5, My Lai 1, etc.) in Quảng Ngãi Province. Despite Thompson's revealing information, Henderson issued a Letter of Commendation to Medina on 27 March 1968.

The following day, 28 March, the commander of Task Force Barker submitted a combat action report for the 16 March operation, in which he stated that the operation in Mỹ Lai was a success, with 128 VC combatants killed. The Americal Division commander, General Koster, sent a congratulatory message to Charlie Company.

General William C. Westmoreland, the head of MACV, also congratulated Charlie Company, 1st Battalion, 20th Infantry for "outstanding action", saying that they had "dealt [the] enemy [a] heavy blow". Later, he changed his stance, writing in his memoir that it was "the conscious massacre of defenseless babies, children, mothers, and old men in a kind of diabolical slow-motion nightmare that went on for the better part of a day, with a cold-blooded break for lunch".

Owing to the chaotic circumstances of the war and the U.S. Army's decision not to undertake a definitive body count of noncombatants in Vietnam, the number of civilians killed at Mỹ Lai cannot be stated with certainty. Estimates vary from source to source, with 347 and 504 being the most commonly cited figures. The memorial at the site of the massacre lists 504 names, with ages ranging from one to 82. A later investigation by the U.S. Army arrived at a lower figure of 347 deaths, the official U.S. estimate. The official estimate by the local government remains 504.

Investigation and cover-up 

Initial reports claimed "128 Viet Cong and 22 civilians" had been killed in the village during a "fierce fire fight". Westmoreland congratulated the unit on the "outstanding job". As relayed at the time by Stars and Stripes magazine, "U.S. infantrymen had killed 128 Communists in a bloody day-long battle."

On 16 March 1968, in the official press briefing known as the "Five O'Clock Follies", a mimeographed release included this passage: "In an action today, Americal Division forces killed 128 enemy near Quang Ngai City. Helicopter gunships and artillery missions supported the ground elements throughout the day."

Initial investigations of the Mỹ Lai operation were undertaken by Colonel Henderson, under orders from the Americal Division's executive officer, Brigadier General George H. Young. Henderson interviewed several soldiers involved in the incident, then issued a written report in late-April claiming that some 20 civilians were inadvertently killed during the operation. According to Henderson's report, the civilian casualties that occurred were accidental and mainly attributed to long-range artillery fire. The Army at this time was still describing the event as a military victory that had resulted in the deaths of 128 enemy combatants.

Six months later, Tom Glen, a 21-year-old soldier of the 11th Light Infantry Brigade, wrote a letter to General Creighton Abrams, the new MACV commander. He described an ongoing and routine brutality against Vietnamese civilians on the part of American forces in Vietnam that he had personally witnessed, and then concluded,It would indeed be terrible to find it necessary to believe that an American soldier that harbors such racial intolerance and disregard for justice and human feeling is a prototype of all American national character; yet the frequency of such soldiers lends credulity to such beliefs. ... What has been outlined here I have seen not only in my own unit, but also in others we have worked with, and I fear it is universal. If this is indeed the case, it is a problem which cannot be overlooked, but can through a more firm implementation of the codes of MACV (Military Assistance Command Vietnam) and the Geneva Conventions, perhaps be eradicated.

Colin Powell, then a 31-year-old Army major serving as an assistant chief of staff of operations for the Americal Division, was charged with investigating the letter, which did not specifically refer to Mỹ Lai, as Glen had limited knowledge of the events there. In his report, Powell wrote, "In direct refutation of this portrayal is the fact that relations between Americal Division soldiers and the Vietnamese people are excellent." A 2018 US Army case study of the massacre noted that Powell "investigated the allegations described in the [Glen] letter. He proved unable to uncover either wide-spread unnecessary killings, war crimes, or any facts related to My Lai ..." 
Powell's handling of the assignment was later characterized by some observers as "whitewashing" the atrocities of Mỹ Lai.

In May 2004, Powell, then United States Secretary of State, told CNN's Larry King, "I mean, I was in a unit that was responsible for Mỹ Lai. I got there after Mỹ Lai happened. So, in war, these sorts of horrible things happen every now and again, but they are still to be deplored."

Seven months prior to the massacre at Mỹ Lai, on Robert McNamara's orders, the Inspector General of the U.S. Defense Department investigated press coverage of alleged atrocities committed in South Vietnam. In August 1967, the 200-page report "Alleged Atrocities by U.S. Military Forces in South Vietnam" was completed.

Independently of Glen, Specialist 5 Ronald L. Ridenhour, a former door gunner from the Aviation Section, Headquarters Company, 11th Infantry Brigade, sent a letter in March 1969 to thirty members of Congress imploring them to investigate the circumstances surrounding the "Pinkville" incident. He and his pilot, Warrant Officer Gilbert Honda, flew over Mỹ Lai several days after the operation and observed a scene of complete destruction. At one point, they hovered over a dead Vietnamese woman with a patch of the 11th Brigade on her body.

Ridenhour himself had not been present when the massacre occurred, but his account was compiled from detailed conversations with soldiers of Charlie Company who had witnessed and, in some cases, participated in the killing. He became convinced that something "rather dark and bloody did indeed occur" at Mỹ Lai, and was so disturbed by the tales he heard that within three months of being discharged from the Army he penned his concerns to Congress as well as the Chairman of the Joint Chiefs of Staff, and the President. He included the name of Michael Bernhardt, an eyewitness who agreed to testify, in the letter.

Most recipients of Ridenhour's letter ignored it, with the exception of Congressman Mo Udall and Senators Barry Goldwater and Edward Brooke. Udall urged the House Armed Services Committee to call on Pentagon officials to conduct an investigation.

Public revelation and reaction 

Under mounting pressure caused by Ridenhour's letter, on 9 September 1969, the Army quietly charged Calley with six specifications of premeditated murder for the deaths of 109 South Vietnamese civilians near the village of Sơn Mỹ, at a hamlet called simply "My Lai".

Calley's court martial was not released to press and did not commence until over a year later. However, word of Calley's prosecution found its way to American investigative reporter and freelance journalist Seymour Hersh. My Lai was first revealed to the American public on November 13, 1969—almost two years after the incident—when Hersh published a story through the Dispatch News Service. The article threatened to undermine the U.S. war effort and severely damage the Nixon presidency. Inside the White House, officials privately discussed how to contain the scandal. On November 21, National Security Advisor Henry Kissinger emphasized that the White House needed to develop a "game plan", to establish a "press policy", and maintain a "unified line" in its public response to the incident. The White House established a "My Lai Task Force" whose mission was to "figure out how best to control the problem", to make sure that administration officials "all don't go in different directions" when discussing the incident, and to "engage in dirty tricks". These included discrediting key witnesses and questioning Hersh's motives for releasing the story. What soon followed was a public relations offensive by the administration designed to shape how My Lai would be portrayed in the press and understood among the American public.

After extensive interviews with Calley, Hersh broke the Mỹ Lai story in 35 newspapers on 13 November 1969; additionally, the Alabama Journal in Montgomery and the New York Times ran separate stories on the allegations against Calley on the 12th and 13th of November, respectively; on 20 November, Time, Life and Newsweek all covered the story, and CBS televised an interview with Paul Meadlo, a soldier in Calley's unit during the massacre. The Plain Dealer (Cleveland, Ohio) published explicit photographs of dead villagers killed at Mỹ Lai.

As members of Congress called for an inquiry and news correspondents abroad expressed their horror at the massacre, the General Counsel of the Army Robert Jordan was tasked with speaking to the press. He refused to confirm allegations against Calley. Noting the significance of the fact that the statement was given at all, Bill Downs of ABC News said it amounted to the first public expression of concern by a "high defense official" that American troops "might have committed genocide".

In November 1969, Lieutenant General William R. Peers was appointed by the Secretary of the Army and the Army Chief of Staff to conduct a thorough review of the My Lai incident, 16–19 March 1968, and its investigation by the Army. Peers's final report, presented to higher-ups on 17 March 1970, was highly critical of top officers at brigade and divisional levels for participating in the cover-up, and the Charlie Company officers for their actions at Mỹ Lai.

According to Peers's findings:[The 1st Battalion] members had killed at least 175–200 Vietnamese men, women, and children. The evidence indicates that only 3 or 4 were confirmed as Viet Cong although there were undoubtedly several unarmed VC (men, women, and children) among them and many more active supporters and sympathizers. One man from the company was reported as wounded from the accidental discharge of his weapon. ... a tragedy of major proportions had occurred at Son My.

In a 2003 US Naval Academy lecture Warrant Officer Hugh Thompson said of the Peers report:

In 1968, an American journalist, Jonathan Schell, wrote that in the Vietnamese province of Quang Ngai, where the Mỹ Lai massacre occurred, up to 70% of all villages were destroyed by the air strikes and artillery bombardments, including the use of napalm; 40 percent of the population were refugees, and the overall civilian casualties were close to 50,000 a year. Regarding the massacre at Mỹ Lai, he stated, "There can be no doubt that such an atrocity was possible only because a number of other methods of killing civilians and destroying their villages had come to be the rule, and not the exception, in our conduct of the war".

In May 1970, a sergeant who participated in Operation Speedy Express wrote a confidential letter to then Army Chief of Staff Westmoreland describing civilian killings he said were on the scale of the massacre occurring as "a My Lai each month for over a year" during 1968–69. Two other letters to this effect from enlisted soldiers to military leaders in 1971, all signed "Concerned Sergeant", were uncovered within declassified National Archive documents. The letters describe common occurrences of civilian killings during population pacification operations. Army policy also stressed very high body counts and this resulted in dead civilians being marked down as combatants. Alluding to indiscriminate killings described as unavoidable, the commander of the 9th Infantry Division, then Major General Julian Ewell, in September 1969, submitted a confidential report to Westmoreland and other generals describing the countryside in some areas of Vietnam as resembling the battlefields of Verdun.

In July 1969, the Office of Provost Marshal General of the Army began to examine the evidence collected by the Peers inquiry regarding possible criminal charges. Eventually, Calley was charged with several counts of premeditated murder in September 1969, and 25 other officers and enlisted men were later charged with related crimes.

Court martial
On 17 November 1970, a court-martial in the United States charged 14 officers, including Major General Koster, the Americal Division's commanding officer, with suppressing information related to the incident. Most of the charges were later dropped. Brigade commander Colonel Henderson was the only high ranking commanding officer who stood trial on charges relating to the cover-up of the Mỹ Lai massacre; he was acquitted on 17 December 1971.

During the four-month-long trial, Calley consistently claimed that he was following orders from his commanding officer, Captain Medina. Despite that, he was convicted and sentenced to life in prison on 29 March 1971, after being found guilty of premeditated murder of not fewer than 20 people. Two days later, President Richard Nixon made the controversial decision to have Calley released from armed custody at Fort Benning, Georgia, and put under house arrest pending appeal of his sentence. Calley's conviction was upheld by the Army Court of Military Review in 1973 and by the U.S. Court of Military Appeals in 1974.

In August 1971, Calley's sentence was reduced by the convening authority from life to twenty years. Calley would eventually serve three and one-half years under house arrest at Fort Benning including three months in the disciplinary barracks at Fort Leavenworth, Kansas. In September 1974, he was paroled by the Secretary of the Army, Howard Callaway.

In a separate trial, Medina denied giving the orders that led to the massacre, and was acquitted of all charges, effectively negating the prosecution's theory of "command responsibility", now referred to as the "Medina standard". Several months after his acquittal, however, Medina admitted he had suppressed evidence and had lied to Henderson about the number of civilian deaths.

Captain Kotouc, an intelligence officer from 11th Brigade, was also court-martialed and found not guilty. Koster was demoted to brigadier general and lost his position as the Superintendent of West Point. His deputy, Brigadier General Young, received a letter of censure. Both were stripped of Distinguished Service Medals which had been awarded for service in Vietnam.

Of the 26 men initially charged, Calley was the only one convicted. Some have argued that the outcome of the Mỹ Lai courts-martial failed to uphold the laws of war established in the Nuremberg and Tokyo War Crimes Tribunals. Telford Taylor, a senior American prosecutor at Nuremberg, wrote that legal principles established at the war crimes trials could have been used to prosecute senior American military commanders for failing to prevent atrocities such as the one at Mỹ Lai.

Howard Callaway, Secretary of the Army, was quoted in The New York Times in 1976 as stating that Calley's sentence was reduced because Calley honestly believed that what he did was a part of his orders—a rationale that contradicts the standards set at Nuremberg and Tokyo, where following orders was not a defense for committing war crimes. On the whole, aside from the Mỹ Lai courts-martial, there were 36 military trials held by the U.S. Army from January 1965 to August 1973 for crimes against civilians in Vietnam.

Some authors have argued that the light punishments of the low-level personnel present at Mỹ Lai and unwillingness to hold higher officials responsible was part of a pattern in which the body-count strategy and the so-called "Mere Gook Rule" encouraged U.S. soldiers to err on the side of killing suspected Vietnamese enemies even if there was a very good chance that they were civilians. This in turn, Nick Turse argues, made lesser known massacres similar to Mỹ Lai and a pattern of war crimes common in Vietnam.

Survivors
In early 1972, the camp at Mỹ Lai (2) where the survivors of the Mỹ Lai massacre had been relocated was largely destroyed by Army of the Republic of Vietnam (ARVN) artillery and aerial bombardment, and remaining eyewitnesses were dispersed. The destruction was officially attributed to "Viet Cong terrorists". Quaker service workers in the area gave testimony in May 1972 by Martin Teitel at hearings before the Congressional Subcommittee to Investigate Problems Connected with Refugees and Escapees in South Vietnam. In June 1972, Teitel's account was published in The New York Times.

Many American soldiers who had been in Mỹ Lai during the massacre accepted personal responsibility for the loss of civilian lives. Some of them expressed regrets without acknowledging any personal guilt, as, for example, Ernest Medina, who said, "I have regrets for it, but I have no guilt over it because I didn't cause it. That's not what the military, particularly the United States Army, is trained for."

Lawrence La Croix, a squad leader in Charlie Company in Mỹ Lai, stated in 2010: "A lot of people talk about Mỹ Lai, and they say, 'Well, you know, yeah, but you can't follow an illegal order.' Trust me. There is no such thing. Not in the military. If I go into a combat situation and I tell them, 'No, I'm not going. I'm not going to do that. I'm not going to follow that order', well, they'd put me up against the wall and shoot me."

On 16 March 1998, a gathering of local people and former American and Vietnamese soldiers stood together at the place of the Mỹ Lai massacre in Vietnam to commemorate its 30th anniversary. American veterans Hugh Thompson and Lawrence Colburn, who were shielding civilians during the massacre, addressed the crowd. Among the listeners was Phan Thi Nhanh, a 14-year-old girl at the time of the massacre. She was saved by Thompson and vividly remembered that tragic day, "We don't say we forget. We just try not to think about the past, but in our hearts we keep a place to think about that". Colburn challenged Lieutenant Calley "...to face the women we faced today who asked the questions they asked, and look at the tears in their eyes and tell them why it happened". No American diplomats or any other officials attended the meeting.

More than a thousand people turned out on 16 March 2008, forty years after the massacre. The Sơn Mỹ Memorial drew survivors and families of victims and some returning U.S. veterans. One woman (an 8-year-old at the time) said, "Everyone in my family was killed in the Mỹ Lai massacre—my mother, my father, my brother and three sisters. They threw me into a ditch full of dead bodies. I was covered with blood and brains." The U.S. was unofficially represented by a volunteer group from Wisconsin called Madison Quakers, who in 10 years built three schools in Mỹ Lai and planted a peace garden.

On 19 August 2009, Calley made his first public apology for the massacre in a speech to the Kiwanis club of Greater Columbus, Georgia:"There is not a day that goes by that I do not feel remorse for what happened that day in Mỹ Lai", he told members of the club. "I feel remorse for the Vietnamese who were killed, for their families, for the American soldiers involved and their families. I am very sorry....If you are asking why I did not stand up to them when I was given the orders, I will have to say that I was a 2nd lieutenant getting orders from my commander and I followed them—foolishly, I guess."

Trần Văn Đức, who was seven years old at the time of the Mỹ Lai massacre and now resides in Remscheid, Germany, called the apology "terse". He wrote a public letter to Calley describing the plight of his and many other families to remind him that time did not ease the pain, and that grief and sorrow over lost lives will forever stay in Mỹ Lai.

Participants

Officers
 LTC Frank A. Barker – commander of the Task Force Barker, a battalion-sized unit, assembled to attack the VC 48th Battalion supposedly based in and around Mỹ Lai. He allegedly ordered the destruction of the village and supervised the artillery barrage and combat assault from his helicopter. Reported the operation as a success; was killed in Vietnam on 13 June 1968, in a mid-air collision before the investigation had begun.
 CPT Kenneth W. Boatman – an artillery forward observer; was accused by the Army of failure to report possible misconduct, but the charge was dropped.
 MAJ Charles C. Calhoun – operations officer of Task Force Barker; charges against him of failure to report possible misconduct were dropped.
 2LT William Calley – platoon leader, 1st Platoon, Charlie Company, First Battalion, 20th Infantry Regiment, 11th Infantry Brigade, 23rd Infantry Division. Was charged in premeditating the murder of 102 civilians, found guilty and sentenced to life. Was paroled in September 1974 by the Secretary of the Army Howard Callaway.
 LTC William D. Guinn Jr. – Deputy Province Senior Advisor/Senior Sector Advisor for Quangngai Province. Charges against him of dereliction of duty and false swearing brought by the Army were dropped.
 COL Oran K. Henderson – 11th Infantry Brigade commander, who ordered the attack and flew in a helicopter over Mỹ Lai during it. After Hugh Thompson immediately reported multiple killings of civilians, Henderson started the cover-up by dismissing the allegation about the massacre and reporting to the superiors that indeed 20 people from Mỹ Lai died by accident. Accused of cover-up and perjury by the Army; charges dropped.
 MG Samuel W. Koster – commander of the 23rd Infantry Division, was not involved with planning the Mỹ Lai search-and-destroy mission. However, during the operation he flew over Mỹ Lai and monitored the radio communications. Afterward, Koster did not follow up with the 11th Brigade commander COL Henderson on the initial investigation, and later was involved in the cover-up. Was charged by the Army with failure to obey lawful regulations, dereliction of duty, and alleged cover-up; charges dropped. Later was demoted to brigadier general and stripped of a Distinguished Service Medal.
 CPT Eugene M. Kotouc – military intelligence officer assigned to Task Force Barker; he partially provided information, on which the Mỹ Lai combat assault was approved; together with Medina and a South Vietnamese officer, he interrogated, tortured and allegedly executed VC and NVA suspects later that day. Was charged with maiming and assault, tried by the jury and acquitted.
 CPT Dennis H. Johnson – 52d Military Intelligence Detachment, assigned to Task Force Barker, was accused of failure to obey lawful regulations; however, charges were later dropped.
 2LT Jeffrey U. Lacross – platoon leader, 3rd Platoon, Charlie Company; testified that his platoon did not meet any armed resistance in Mỹ Lai, and that his men did not kill anybody; however, since, in his words, both Calley and Brooks reported a body count of 60 for their platoons, he then submitted a body count of 6.
 MAJ Robert W. McKnight – operations officer of the 11th Brigade; was accused of false swearing by the Army, but charges were subsequently dropped.
 CPT Ernest Medina – commander of Charlie Company, First' battalion, 20th Infantry; nicknamed Mad Dog by subordinates. He planned, ordered, and supervised the execution of the operation in Sơn Mỹ village. Was accused of failure to report a felony and of murder; went to trial and was acquitted.
 CPT Earl Michaels – Charlie Company commander during My Lai operation; he died in a helicopter crash three months later.
 BG George H. Young Jr. – assistant division commander, 23rd Infantry Division; charged with alleged cover-up, failure to obey lawful regulations and dereliction of duty by the Army; charges were dismissed.
 MAJ Frederic W. Watke – commander of Company B, 123rd Aviation Battalion, 23rd Infantry Division, providing helicopter support on 16 March 1968. Testified that he informed COL Henderson about killings of civilians in My Lai as reported by helicopter pilots. Accused of failure to obey lawful regulations and dereliction of duty; charges dropped.
 CPT Thomas K. Willingham – Company B, Fourth Battalion, 3rd Infantry Regiment, assigned to Task Force Barker; charged with making false official statements and failure to report a felony; charges dropped.

Altogether, 14 officers directly and indirectly involved with the operation, including two generals, were investigated in connection with the Mỹ Lai massacre, except for LTC Frank A. Barker, CPT Earl Michaels, and 2LT Stephen Brooks, who all died before the beginning of the investigation.

1st Platoon, Charlie Company 1st Battalion 20th Infantry
 PFC James Bergthold, Sr. – Assistant gunner and ammo bearer on a machine gun team with Maples. Was never charged with a crime. Admitted that he killed a wounded woman he came upon in a hut, to put her out of her misery.
 PFC Michael Bernhardt – Rifleman; he dropped out of the University of Miami to volunteer for the Army. Bernhardt refused to kill civilians at Mỹ Lai. Captain Medina reportedly later threatened Bernhardt to deter him from exposing the massacre. As a result, Bernhardt was given more dangerous assignments such as point duty on patrol, and would later be afflicted with a form of trench foot as a direct result. Bernhardt told Ridenhour, who was not present at Mỹ Lai during the massacre, about the events, pushing him to continue his investigation. Later he would help expose and detail the massacre in numerous interviews with the press, and he served as a prosecution witness in the trial of Medina, where he was subjected to intense cross examination by defense counsel F. Lee Bailey backed by a team of attorneys including Gary Myers. Bernhardt is a recipient of the New York Society for Ethical Culture's 1970 Ethical Humanist Award.
 PFC Herbert L. Carter – "Tunnel Rat"; shot himself in the foot while reloading his pistol and claimed that he shot himself in the foot in order to be MEDEVACed out of the village when the massacre started.
 PFC Dennis L. Conti – Grenadier/Minesweeper; testified that he initially refused to shoot but later fired some M79 rounds at a group of fleeing people with unknown effect.
 SP4 Lawrence C. La Croix – Squad Leader; testified favourably for Captain Medina during his trial. In 1993 sent a letter to Los Angeles Times, saying, "Now, 25 years later, I have only recently stopped having flashbacks of that morning. I still cannot touch a weapon without vomiting. I am unable to interact with any of the large Vietnamese population in Los Angeles for fear that they might find out who I am; and, because I cannot stand the pain of remembering or wondering if maybe they had relatives or loved ones who were victims at Mỹ Lai... some of us will walk in the jungles and hear the cries of anguish for all eternity".
 PFC James Joseph Dursi – Rifleman; killed a mother and child, then refused to kill anyone else even when ordered to do so by Lieutenant Calley.
 PFC Ronald Grzesik – a team leader. He claimed he followed orders to round up civilians, but refused to kill them.
 SP4 Robert E. Maples – Machine gunner attached to SSG Bacon's squad; stated that he refused an order to kill civilians hiding in a ditch and claimed his commanding officer threatened to shoot him.
 PFC Paul D. Meadlo – Rifleman; said he was afraid of being shot if he did not participate. Lost his foot to a land mine the next day; later, he publicly admitted his part in the massacre.
 SSG David Mitchell – Squad Leader; accused by witnesses of shooting people at the ditch site; pleaded not guilty. Mitchell was acquitted.
 SP4 Charles Sledge – Radiotelephone Operator; later a prosecution witness.
 PV2 Harry Stanley – Grenadier; claimed to have refused an order from Lieutenant Calley to kill civilians that were rounded-up in a bomb-crater but refused to testify against Calley. After he was featured in a documentary and several newspapers, the city of Berkeley, California, designated 17 October as Harry Stanley Day.
 SGT Esequiel Torres – previously had tortured and hanged an old man because Torres found his bandaged leg suspicious. He and Roschevitz (described below) were involved in the shooting of a group of ten women and five children in a hut. Calley ordered Torres to man the machine gun and open fire on the villagers that had been grouped together. Before everyone in the group was down, Torres ceased fire and refused to fire again. Calley took over the M60 and finished shooting the remaining villagers in that group himself. Torres was charged with murder but acquitted.
 SP4 Frederick J. Widmer – Assistant Radiotelephone Operator; Widmer, who has been the subject of pointed blame, is quoted as saying, "The most disturbing thing I saw was one boy—and this was something that, you know, this is what haunts me from the whole, the whole ordeal down there. And there was a boy with his arm shot off, shot up half, half hanging on and he just had this bewildered look in his face and like, 'What did I do, what's wrong?' He was just, you know, it's, it's hard to describe, couldn't comprehend. I, I shot the boy, killed him and it's—I'd like to think of it more or less as a mercy killing because somebody else would have killed him in the end, but it wasn't right." Widmer died on 11 August 2016, aged 68.

Before being shipped to South Vietnam, all of Charlie Company's soldiers went through an advanced infantry training and basic unit training at Pohakuloa Training Area in Hawaii. At Schofield Barracks they were taught how to treat POWs and how to distinguish VC guerrillas from civilians by a Judge Advocate.

Other soldiers
 Nicholas Capezza – Chief Medic; HHQ Company; insisted he saw nothing unusual.
 William Doherty and Michael Terry – 3rd Platoon soldiers who participated in the killing of the wounded in a ditch.
 SGT Ronald L. Haeberle – Photographer; Information Office, 11th Brigade; was attached to Charlie Company. Then SGT Haeberle carried and operated two cameras during the operation: an official US Army-issued camera using black and white film, which was submitted as part of the report in the operation to brigade authorities, and a privately owned camera loaded with colour film. Haeberle by his own testimony at the Courts Martial, admitted that official photographs generally did not include soldiers committing the killings and generally avoided identifying the individual perpetrators, while the colour camera contained numerous images of soldiers killing elderly men, women of various ages and children. Haeberle also testified that he destroyed most of the colour slides which incriminated individual soldiers on the basis that he believed it was unfair to place the blame only on these individuals when many more were equally guilty. He made attempts to sell these photographs to US newspapers on his return home and was investigated by the US Army for this. Considerable criticism has been levelled at Haeberle for remaining silent during the initial attempts at covering up the incident when he had considerable evidence in his possession, as well as his later seeming attempts to benefit financially from the sale of this evidence. 
 Sergeant Minh, Duong – ARVN interpreter, 52nd Military intelligence Detachment, attached to Task Force Barker; confronted Captain Medina about the number of civilians that were killed. Medina reportedly replied, "Sergeant Minh, don't ask anything — those were the orders."
 SGT Gary D. Roschevitz – Grenadier; 2nd platoon; according to the testimony of James M. McBreen, Roschevitz killed five or six people standing together with a canister shot from his M79 grenade launcher, which had a shotgun effect after exploding; also grabbed an M16 rifle from Varnado Simpson to kill five Vietnamese prisoners. According to various witnesses, he later forced several women to undress with the intention of raping them. When the women refused, he reportedly shot at them.
 PFC Varnado Simpson – Rifleman; 2nd Platoon; admitted that he slew around 10 people in My Lai on CPT Medina's orders to kill not only people, but even cats and dogs. He fired at a group of people where he allegedly saw a man with a weapon, but instead killed a woman with a baby. He committed suicide in 1997, after repeatedly acknowledging remorse for several murders in Mỹ Lai.
 SGT Kenneth Hodges, squad leader, was charged with rape and murder during the My Lai Massacre. In every interview given he strictly claimed that he was following orders.

Rescue helicopter crew
 WO1 Hugh Thompson Jr.
 SP4 Glenn Andreotta
 SP4 Lawrence Colburn

Media coverage
A photographer and a reporter from the 11th Brigade Information Office were attached to Task Force Barker and landed with Charlie Company in Sơn Mỹ on 16 March 1968. Neither the Americal News Sheet published 17 March 1968, nor the Trident, 11th Infantry Brigade newsletter from 22 March 1968, reported the deaths of noncombatants in Mỹ Lai. The Stars and Stripes published a laudatory piece, "U.S. troops Surrounds Red, Kill 128", on March 18.

On 12 April 1968, the Trident wrote, "The most punishing operations undertaken by the brigade in Operation Muscatine's area involved three separate raids into the village and vicinity of My Lai, which cost the VC 276 killed". On 4 April 1968, the information office of the 11th Brigade issued a press-release, Recent Operations in Pinkville, without reporting mass casualties among civilians. Subsequent criminal investigation found that, "Both individuals failed to report what they had seen, the reporter wrote a false and misleading account of the operation, and the photographer withheld and suppressed from proper authorities the photographic evidence of atrocities he had obtained."

The first reporting of the Mỹ Lai massacre appeared in the American media after Fort Benning issued a press release related to the charges pressed against Lieutenant William Calley. This was issued on 5 September 1969.

Consequently, NBC aired on 10 September 1969 a segment in the Huntley-Brinkley Report which reported the killings of numerous civilians in South Vietnam. Following that, Ronald Ridenhour decided to disobey the Army's order to withhold the information from the media. He approached reporter Ben Cole of the Phoenix Republic, who chose not to handle the scoop. Charles Black from the Columbus Enquirer uncovered the story on his own but also decided to put it on hold. Two major national news press outlets—The New York Times and The Washington Post—received some tips with partial information but did not act on them.

Ridenhour called Seymour Hersh on 22 October 1969. The freelance investigative journalist conducted an independent inquiry, and published to break the wall of silence that was surrounding the Mỹ Lai massacre. Hersh initially tried to sell the story to Life and Look magazines; both turned it down. Hersh went to the small, Washington-based Dispatch News Service, which sent it to fifty major American newspapers; thirty accepted it for publication. New York Times reporter Henry Kamm investigated further and found several survivors of the Mỹ Lai massacre in South Vietnam. He estimated the number of civilians killed as 567.

Next, Ben Cole published an article about Ronald Ridenhour, a helicopter gunner and an Army whistleblower, who was among the first who started to uncover the truth about the Mỹ Lai massacre. Joseph Eszterhas of The Plain Dealer, a friend of Ron Haeberle, knew about the photo evidence of the massacre; he published the grisly images of the dead bodies of old men, women, and children on 20 November 1969. Time Magazine's article on 28 November 1969 and in Life magazine on 5 December 1969, finally brought Mỹ Lai to the fore of the public debate about Vietnam War.

Richard L. Strout, the Christian Science Monitor political commentator, wrote: "American press self-censorship thwarted Mr. Ridenhour's disclosures for a year. 'No one wanted to go into it', his agent said of telegrams sent to Life, Look, and Newsweek magazines outlining allegations...."

Afterward, interviews and stories connected to the Mỹ Lai massacre started to appear regularly in the American and international press.

Concluding an ABC television news broadcast, anchor man Frank Reynolds said to his audience that, as a consequence of the allegations, ‘‘our spirit as a people is scarred.’’ The massacre, he believed, offered ‘‘the most compelling argument yet advanced for America to end its involvement in Vietnam, not alone because of what the war is doing to the Vietnamese or to our reputation abroad, but because of what it is doing to us.’’

War crimes investigation
Following the massacre a Pentagon task force called the Vietnam War Crimes Working Group (VWCWG) investigated alleged atrocities which were committed against South Vietnamese civilians by U.S. troops and created a secret archive of some 9,000 pages which documents 320 alleged incidents from 1967–1971 including 7 massacres in which at least 137 civilians died; 78 additional attacks targeting noncombatants in which at least 57 were killed, 56 were wounded and 15 were sexually assaulted; and 141 incidents of U.S. soldiers torturing civilian detainees or prisoners of war. 203 U.S. personnel were charged with crimes, 57 of them were court-martialed and 23 of them were convicted. The VWCWG also investigated over 500 additional alleged atrocities but it could not verify them.

Cultural representations

Music

Over 100 songs were released about the My Lai massacre and Lt. William Calley, identified by the Vietnam War Song Project. During the war years (from 1969–1973), around half of the songs displayed support for Calley, while around half took an anti-war position and criticized the actions of Calley. All the songs in the post-war era were critical of the actions of Calley and his platoon. Commercially, the most successful song was "The Battle Hymn of Lt. Calley" by Terry Nelson, which peaked at No. 37 in the Billboard Hot 100 on 1 May 1971, selling over 1 million records. Despite success, Tex Ritter cancelled his cover of the song because his record label, Capitol, viewed it as controversial. John Deer's cover of the song bubbled under the Billboard Hot 100 on 1 May 1971, at No. 114.

On television, film and video
 The 1971 documentary Interviews with My Lai Veterans won the Academy Award for Best Documentary, Short Subjects. In it, five American soldiers discussed their participation in the massacres.
 In 1975, Stanley Kramer and Lee Bernhard directed a docudrama, Judgment: The Court Martial of Lieutenant William Calley, with Tony Musante as Lieutenant Calley, and Harrison Ford as Frank Crowder.
 On 2 May 1989, the British television station Yorkshire Television broadcast the documentary Four Hours in My Lai, directed by Kevin Sim, as part of the networked series First Tuesday. Using eyewitness statements from both Vietnamese and Americans, the programme revealed new evidence about the massacre. The program was subsequently aired by PBS in the United States on 23 May as Remember My Lai (Frontline, Season 7).
 In 1994, a video film My Lai Revisited was aired on 60 Minutes by CBS.
 On 15 March 2008, the BBC broadcast the documentary The My Lai Tapes on Radio 4 and subsequently on the BBC World Service, in both English and Vietnamese, that used never-before-heard audio recordings of testimony taken at The Pentagon during the 1969–70 Peers's Inquiry.
 On 26 April 2010, the American PBS broadcast a documentary as part of its American Experience series, entitled The American Experience: My Lai.
 On 10 December 2010, Italian producer Gianni Paolucci released a movie entitled My Lai Four, directed by Paolo Bertola, starring American actor Beau Ballinger as Calley, and adapted from the Pulitzer Prize–winning book by Seymour Hersh.
In 2018, My Lai Inside, a documentary by Christoph Felder was released

In theater
The Lieutenant is a 1975 Broadway rock opera that concerns the Mỹ Lai massacre and resulting courts martial. It was nominated for four Tony Awards including Best Musical and Best Book of a Musical.

Photography
The Mỹ Lai massacre, like many other events in Vietnam, was captured on camera by U.S. Army personnel. The most published and graphic images were taken by Ronald Haeberle, a U.S. Army Public Information Detachment photographer who accompanied the men of Charlie Company that day.

In 2009, Haeberle said that he destroyed a number of photographs he took during the massacre. Unlike the photographs of the dead bodies, the destroyed photographs depicted Americans in the actual process of murdering Vietnamese civilians. According to M. Paul Holsinger, the And babies poster, which used a Haeberle photo, was "easily the most successful poster to vent the outrage that so many felt about the human cost of the conflict in Southeast Asia. Copies are still frequently seen in retrospectives dealing with the popular culture of the Vietnam War era or in collections of art from the period."

Another soldier, John Henry Smail of the 3rd Platoon, took at least 16 color photographs depicting U.S. Army personnel, helicopters, and aerial views of Mỹ Lai. These, along with Haeberle's photographs, were included in the "Report of the Department of the Army review of the Preliminary Investigations into the My Lai Incident". Former First Lieutenant (1LT) Roger L. Alaux Jr., a forward artillery observer, who was assigned to Charlie Company during the combat assault on Mỹ Lai 4, also took some photographs from a helicopter that day, including aerial views of Mỹ Lai, and of the Charlie Company's landing zone.

A  Sơn Mỹ Memorial dedicated to victims of the Sơn Mỹ (Mỹ Lai) massacre was created in the village of Tịnh Khê, Sơn Tịnh District, Quảng Ngãi Province, Vietnam. The graves with headstones, signs on the places of killing and a museum are all located on memorial site. The War Remnants Museum in Ho Chi Minh City has an exhibition on Mỹ Lai.

Some American veterans chose to go on pilgrimage to the site of the massacre to heal and reconcile.

Veterans, including Hugh Thompson Jr. and Lawrence Colburn from the helicopter rescue crew, attended the ceremony. Mike Boehm, a veteran who was instrumental in the peace park effort, said, "We cannot forget the past, but we cannot live with anger and hatred either. With this park of peace, we have created a green, rolling, living monument to peace."

On 16 March 2001, the Mỹ Lai Peace Park was dedicated, a joint venture of the Quảng Ngãi Province Women's Union, the Madison Quakers' charitable organization, and the Vietnamese government.

See also

 Human rights in the United States
 Massacre at Huế
 Operation Speedy Express
 Operation Wheeler/Wallowa
 Phoenix Program
 Russell Tribunal
 United States war crimes#Vietnam War
 Vietnam War Crimes Working Group
 Seymour Hersh
 Tiger Force

References

Further reading

 161st Assault Helicopter Company. Unit History of the 161st Assault Helicopter Company (who intervened in the massacre)
 Americal Division Veterans Association; Americal Locations in Vietnam, cited 3 June 2006.
 Anderson, David L. (1998) Facing My Lai: Moving Beyond the Massacre University Press of Kansas: Lawrence, Kansas – extensive interviews with trial participants and soldiers.
 Angers, Trent (1999) The Forgotten Hero of My Lai: The Hugh Thompson Story Lafayette, La.: Acadian House.
 Becker, Elizabeth. Kissinger Tapes Describe Crises, War and Stark Photos of Abuse., The New York Times, 27 May 2004 (mirrored)
 Belknap, Michal R. (2002) The Vietnam War on Trial: The My Lai Massacre and the Court-Martial of Lieutenant Calley. University Press of Kansas. .
 Beidler, Philip D., "Calley's Ghost", Virginia Quarterly Review, Winter 2003.
 Bilton, Michael and Sim, Kevin. (1992) Four Hours in My Lai New York: Viking – a re-examination, draws extensively on interviews with participants and contains detailed bibliographic references.
 Chomsky, Noam. After Pinkville, Bertrand Russell War Crimes Tribunal on Vietnam, 1971
 Chomsky, Noam and Edward S. Herman. Counter-Revolutionary Violence: Bloodbaths in Fact & Propaganda, 1973 and 2004
 Colburn, Lawrence and Paula Brock. The Choices Made – Lessons from My Lai on Drawing the Line, Seattle Times, 10 March 2002
 Gershen, Martin. (1971) Destroy or Die: The True Story of My Lai New York: Arlington House.
 Goldstein, Joseph. (1976) The My Lai Massacre and its Cover-Up New York: Free Press.
 Greiner, Bernd. (2009) War without Fronts: The USA in Vietnam New Haven: Yale University Press.
 Greiner, Bernd. (2009) The March 1968 Massacre in My Lai 4 and My Khe 4, Online Encyclopedia of Mass Violence, [online], published on 5 October 2009, URL, 
 Hammer, Richard. (1971) The Court-Martial of Lt. Calley New York: Coward.
 Hastings, Max, "Wrath of the Centurions" (review of Howard Jones, My Lai: Vietnam, 1968 and the Descent into Darkness, Oxford, 2017, 504 pp.), London Review of Books, vol. 40, no. 2 (25 January 2018), pp. 19–22.
 Hersh, Seymour M. (1972). Cover-up: the Army's secret investigation of the massacre at My Lai 4. Random House. .
 Hersh, Seymour M. (1970). My Lai 4: A Report on the Massacre and Its Aftermath. Random House. .
 Hersh, Seymour M. The original, Pulitzer-Prize winning articles about the My Lai Massacre for the St. Louis Post Dispatch, 13 November, 20 November and 25 November 1969.
 Hersh, Seymour M. " Looking for Calley - How a young journalist untangled the riddle of My Lai", Harper's Magazine, June 2018.
 My Lai and Why It Matters: Review of Ron Ridenhour's Videotaped Lecture
 Jones, Howard (2017) My Lai, Vietnam, 1968, and the Descent into Darkness. Oxford University Press. .
 O'Brien, Tim. (1994) In the Lake of the Woods, McClelland & Stewart.  – historical fiction about a Vietnam Vet who can't escape his own experience of My Lai.
 Olson, James S. and Roberts, Randy (eds.) (1998) My Lai: A Brief History with Documents, Palgrave MacMillan. 
 Peers, William R. (1970). Robert E. Lester, ed. The Peers inquiry of the massacre at My Lai. Bethesda, MD: University Publications of America, 1996. 
 Raimondo, Maj. Tony, JA. The My Lai Massacre: A Case Study, Human Rights Program, School of the Americas, Fort Benning, Georgia
 Ridenhour, Ron. "Jesus Was a Gook"
 Rockwood, Lawrence. "The Lesson Avoided: the Official Legacy of the My Lai Massacre", The Moral Dimension of Asymmetrical Warfare, Counter-terrorism, Democratic Values and Military Ethics, Netherlands Defense College (2008).
 Sack, John. (1971) Lieutenant Calley: His Own Story New York: Viking.
 
 University of Missouri-Kansas City Law School. The My Lai Courts-Martial, 1970
 Teitel, Martin. Again, the Suffering of Mylai, article preview, New York Times, 7 June 1972, p. 45.
 Texas Tech University. The Vietnam Oral History Project
 Toledo Blade. Special Report: Tiger Force
 Chapter 24 "Transgressions" deals with the My Lai Massacre.

External links

 My Lai – An American Experience, WGBH, PBS Documentary
 The Peers Inquiry of the Massacre at My Lai, Library of Congress.
 Into The Dark: The My Lai Massacre Crime Library on truTV.com
 The My Lai Courts-Martial, 1970
 The My Lai Massacre
 BBC World Service: The My Lai Tapes
 My Lai Revisited: 47 Years Later, Seymour Hersh Travels to Vietnam Site of U.S. Massacre He Exposed from Democracy Now!
 1st Battalion, 20th Infantry – members of Company C, including 2LT Calley (original source)
 HHC 1st Battalion, 20th Infantry, daily report 16 March 1968 (original source)

 
Massacres committed by the United States
Vietnam War crimes committed by the United States
Collective punishment
Mass murder in 1968
Massacres in 1968
History of Quảng Ngãi province
Massacres in Vietnam
United States Army in the Vietnam War
March 1968 events in Asia
Conflicts in 1968
1968 crimes in Vietnam
United States military scandals
Events that led to courts-martial
Anti-communist terrorism
Terrorism in Vietnam